The Steam Deck is a handheld gaming computer developed by Valve Corporation. Released on February 25, 2022, the Steam Deck can be played as a handheld or connected to a monitor in a similar manner to the Nintendo Switch. It is an x86-64-v3 device running SteamOS, with integrated gaming inputs designed to play the full Steam library, including Windows games via the Linux-based Proton compatibility layer. The system is an open platform, allowing users to install compatible non-Steam games and applications or operating systems on the device.

History
Valve's first foray into hardware was with the Steam Machine, a computer specification based on the Linux-derived SteamOS that could be adopted by any computer manufacturer to make systems optimized for running Steam and games from it. Introduced in 2015, the platform did not sell well and Valve quietly pulled back on it by April 2018, but stated they remained committed to providing some type of open-hardware platform. Steam Deck designer Scott Dalton said "there was always kind of this classic chicken and egg problem with the Steam Machine", as it required the adoption of Linux by both gamers and game developers to reach a critical interest in the machines to draw manufacturers in making them. The lack of Linux game availability during the lifetime of Steam Machines led Valve to invest development into Proton, a Linux-based compatibility layer to allow most Windows–based applications and games to be run on Linux without modification.

Other factors from the Steam Machine line worked their way into the conception of the Steam Deck. The Steam Controller was developed by Valve as part of the Steam Machine line. Some of the early prototypes of the controller included a small LCD screen within the middle of the controller which could be programmed as a second screen alongside the game that the user was playing. One idea from this prototype was to include the Steam Link, a hardware device capable of streaming game content from a computer running Steam to a different monitor, here routing that output to the small LCD on the controller. This was later considered by Valve a very early concept behind the Steam Deck. Further, their experience with trying to convince other manufacturers to produce Steam Machines led Valve to realize that it was better to develop all their hardware internally. Dalton said, "More and more it just became kind of clear, the more of this we are doing internally, the more we can kind of make a complete package."

Rumors that Valve was working on a portable gaming unit had emerged in May 2021, based on updates made within the Steam code pointing towards a new "SteamPal" device, and comments made by Gabe Newell related to Valve developing games for consoles. Ars Technica had been able to confirm that new hardware was in development at Valve.

Valve revealed the Steam Deck on July 15, 2021. The Deck, existing in three different models based on internal storage options, was shipped starting in February 2022 in North America and Europe, with other regions to follow throughout the year. However, due to its popularity, some pre-order purchasers were informed that later shipments of the 64 GB model and 256 GB NVMe models would be in Q2 2022 and the 512 GB NVMe model by Q3 2022. Valve informed pre-purchasers in November 2021 that due to the ongoing global chip shortage, the device would fail to ship by December and instead would ship in February 2022, retaining the same order for delivery based on pre-order placement.

Valve's CEO, Gabe Newell, said of the Steam Deck's approach, "As a gamer, this is a product I've always wanted. And as a game developer, it's the mobile device I've always wanted for our partners." According to Newell, they wanted to be "very aggressive" on the release and pricing strategy as they considered the mobile market as their primary competitor for the Deck. However, their focus was on the unit's performance; Newell stated, "But the first thing was the performance and the experience, [that] was the biggest and most fundamental constraint that was driving this." Newell recognized that the base pricing was somewhat lower than expected and "painful", but necessary to meet the expectation of gamers that would want the Deck. Newell continued that he believed this was a new product category of personal computer hardware that Valve and other computer manufacturers would continue to participate in if the Steam Deck proved successful, and thus it was necessary to keep the unit's price point reasonable to demonstrate viability. The openness of the system was also a key feature according to Newell, as that is a defining "superpower" of the personal computer space over typical console systems. Newell did not want to have any limitations on what the end user could do with the hardware, such as installing alternate non-Steam software on it.

Pre-orders for the Steam Deck were opened a day after its announcement. Pre-orders were limited to those with Steam accounts opened before June 2021, to prevent resellers from depleting stock and making the device more difficult to purchase. First-day pre-order reservations through the Steam storefront briefly crashed the servers due to the demand. By September 2021, development kits for the Steam Deck were shipping to developers. The device was released on February 25, 2022.

For the planned release in Asian regions, Valve worked with Komodo to help with local production, localization, and distribution support.

By June 2022, Valve stated they were able to double the number of Steam Decks shipping out each week, helping to meet the initial reservations, and by August 2022, Valve's production was outpacing expectations, allowing them to send out Steam Decks to consumers that were originally anticipated to ship in the final quarter of the year. Valve was able to fulfill all reservations by October 2022, opening the Steam Deck to purchase without reservation, though Valve tentatively will return to a reservation system should demand be too high.

As of December 2022, Valve is pursuing improvements on the current Steam Deck design, including an audio mixer, per-game "power profiles", and some other performance improvements, as well as evaluating a second generation Steam Deck. Valve is also considering bringing some of the Steam Deck technology into a new Steam Controller 2.

Hardware
The Steam Deck includes a custom AMD APU based on their Zen 2 and RDNA 2 architectures, named Aerith, after the Final Fantasy VII character Aerith Gainsborough. The CPU runs a four-core/eight-thread unit and the GPU runs on eight compute units with a total estimated performance of 1.6 TFLOPS. Both the CPU and GPU use variable timing frequencies, with the CPU running between 2.4 and 3.5 GHz and the GPU between 1.0 and 1.6 GHz based on current processor needs. Valve stated that the CPU has comparable performance to Ryzen 3000 desktop computer processors and the GPU performance to the Radeon RX 6000 series. The Deck includes 16 GB of LPDDR5 RAM in a quad-channel configuration, with a total bandwidth of 88 GB/s.

The Deck's main unit is designed for handheld use. It includes a  touchscreen LCD display with a 1280×800 pixel resolution with a fixed 60 Hz refresh rate; games are configured to use vertical synchronization where possible. The unit's input set features two thumbsticks, a directional pad, ABXY buttons, two shoulder buttons on each side of the unit, four additional buttons on the rear of the unit, as well as two trackpads under each thumbstick. The thumbsticks and trackpads use capacitive sensing, and the unit further includes a gyroscope to allow for more specialized controls on the handheld mode. The unit also includes haptic feedback.

The unit shipped in three models based on internal storage options. The base model includes a 64 GB eMMC internal storage unit, running over PCI Express 2.0 x1. A mid-tier model includes 256 GB of storage through an NVMe SSD device, while the high-end unit includes a 512 GB NVMe SSD storage unit, with the latter two both shipping with drives that run PCI Express 3.0 x4. All 3 SKUs utilize the same M.2 2230 interface for internal storage. Valve stated that the built-in storage is not meant to be replaceable by end-users, though can be replaced as necessary for repair. Additional storage space is available through a microSD card slot, which also supports microSDXC and microSDHC formats.

The Deck supports Bluetooth connectivity for input devices, including common game controllers, and includes integrated WiFi network support to meet IEEE 802.11a/b/g/n/ac standards, stereo sound out via a digital signal processor, an integrated microphone and a headphone jack,  a 40 watt-hour battery, which Valve estimates that for "lighter use cases like game streaming, smaller 2D games, or web browsing" can last between seven and eight hours. Valve also estimated that by keeping frame rates to around 30 frames per second (FPS) more intensive games such as Portal 2 could be played for five to six hours. The system's software includes an optional FPS limiter that balance a game's performance to optimize battery life.

At release, Steam Decks were only manufactured in a black casing to reduce the complexity of production, though Valve stated that they have considered introducing other case colors or themes in the future. Valve partnered with iFixit to provide replacement parts for users.

A dock unit was released on October 6, 2022. The dock unit can be connected to an external power source to power the Deck, and to an external monitor via either HDMI or DisplayPort protocols to route output from the Deck to that monitor. Though limited by the processor speed, the display output from the Deck via the dock can reach as high as 8k resolution at 60 Hz or 4k resolution at 120 Hz; this resolution boost can also be achieved by attaching the Deck directly through a USB to HDMI adapter without the use of the docking station. There is no other change in performance of the Steam Deck whether docked or when used in portable mode. The dock also supports Ethernet network connectivity and support for USB connections for controllers or other input devices. The Deck can also work with any third-party docking station that supports similar types of interfacing for portable devices. External GPUs are not officially supported, although testing via the M2 slot has demonstrated that eGPUs are capable of running when connected to the Deck.

As Valve considered options for bringing a handheld device to market, they set a priority that the device had to be able to play nearly the entirety of the Steam game library, and rejected possible hardware that moved away from the standard x86-based processing structure that would have been easier to implement in handheld form but would have limited what games would be available. Only through recent discussions with AMD and their current product lines was Valve able to identify a technical approach that would meet the goal of a handheld device capable of playing all Steam games without overtaxing the processor unit. The developers considered the Steam Deck to be future-proof. While the specifications are modest compared to high-end gaming computers, they felt that the performance was at a good place that would be acceptable for many years, while still looking at newer software improvements, such as the addition of AMD's FidelityFX Super Resolution (FSR). Though they do not have any current designs for a successor, Valve stated that there would likely be future iterations of the hardware in years to come, but the company expects the timing of releases to depend on the current state of processor technology and handheld device limitations rather than a regular upgrade cycle.

Software

Steam Deck runs a modified Arch Linux operating system called SteamOS v3.3. While SteamOS had been previously developed for Steam Machines using Debian Linux, Valve stated that they wanted to use a rolling upgrade approach for the Deck's system software, a function Debian was not designed for but was a feature of Arch Linux. An application programming interface (API) specific for the Steam Deck is available to game developers, allowing a game to specify certain settings if it is being run on a Steam Deck compared to a normal computer. Within the Steam storefront, developers can populate a special file depot for their game with lower-resolution textures and other reduced elements to allow their game to perform better on the Steam Deck; Steam automatically detects and downloads the appropriate files for the system (whether on a computer or Steam Deck) when the user installs the game.

Linux-native games can be played directly on SteamOS. The SteamOS software includes support for Proton, a compatibility layer that allows most games developed for Windows to be played on the Linux-based SteamOS. According to ProtonDB, a user-run database that compiles information on game compatibility of Steam games within Linux using Proton, several of Steam's more popular game releases were not yet compatible with Proton primarily due to anti-circumvention and anti-cheat controls or digital rights management (DRM). Valve stated they were working with vendors of these middleware solutions to improve Proton support while also encouraging Linux-specific versions to be developed. Epic Games' Easy Anti-Cheat, one of the more popular anti-cheat options for developers, was made available for MacOS and Linux systems in September 2021, which Epic stated that developers could easily transition for the Proton layer. Valve worked with Epic over the end of 2021 to make the transition of Easy Anti-Cheat to Proton simple for developers. Another popular anti-cheat solution, BattlEye, also affirmed their software was ready to work with the Proton layer and only required developers to opt-in to enable it. Valve stated that in testing games otherwise currently available on Linux or compatible with the Proton layer, they had yet to find a game that failed to meet a minimum 30 frames-per-second performance on the handheld, a performance metric comparable to the consoles of the eighth generation. The Proton layer includes support for AMD's upscaling technology FidelityFX Super Resolution (FSR); while Proton also supports Nvidia's DLSS upscaling solution, this was not included in the Deck.

Due to potential confusion on game compatibility, Valve introduced a process in October 2021 by which they brought in additional staff to review games on Steam in order to make sure a game is fully playable on the Steam Deck. Games that are confirmed to be compatible with the Steam Deck, including those with Proton and any middleware DRM solutions, that by default meet minimum performance specifications, are marked as "Verified". Games that may require some user tinkering with settings, such as having to use a system control to bring up the on-screen keyboard, are tagged as "Playable". Another category, "Unsupported", are games that Valve has tested to not be fully compatible with the Steam Deck, such as VR games or games using Windows-specific codecs that have not yet been made compatible with Proton. These ratings are to change over time as both the Steam Deck software improves as well as updates made by developers to games to improve compatibility with the Steam Deck software.

The Steam client on the Deck runs a revised version of the Steam client for desktops. Unlike Steam's Big Picture mode which was designed for use on television screens, which was treated as a separate software branch within Valve, the Deck version of the Steam client stays consistent with the desktop version, adding functions and interface elements to make navigating through Steam easier with controller input, and indicators typical for portable systems such as battery life and wireless connectivity. Valve replaced the previous Big Picture mode in Steam with one based on the Steam Deck user interface in February 2023. The version of Steam on the Deck otherwise supports all other functions of Steam, including user profiles and friends lists, access to game communities, cloud saving, Steam Workshop support, and the Remote Play feature. Remote Play also allows the Steam Deck to be used as a controller for a game running on a computer, providing additional control options beyond traditional keyboard and mouse or common controller systems. The Steam software on the Deck also supports suspending a game in progress, a feature considered by Valve to be core to the Deck. Otherwise, games that do not take advantage of the Steam Deck API have the handheld's controller input automatically converted for them. For example, the touch-sensitive controllers on the Deck translate input appropriately for games that typically rely on keyboard and mouse controls. Valve added to Steam's current approach to cloud saving with the introduction of Dynamic Cloud Sync in January 2022. Prior cloud functionality only synchronized game saves after the user has exited a game; developers can enable Dynamic Cloud Sync to use cloud saving while the game is running, making this feature more amenable for portable use on the Steam Deck.

Users download games onto the Steam Deck to store on either the internal storage or SD card, each storage device treated as a separate Steam Library for games. This allows SD cards with different Steam Libraries to be swapped in and out. Valve is exploring the ability to pre-load games on an SD card outside of the Deck, such as through a personal computer. The ability to download games onto the Steam Deck from a local network Steam installation was added in February 2023.

While the Deck was designed for playing Steam-based games, it can be loaded with third-party software, such as alternative storefronts like Epic Games Store, Ubisoft Connect, or Origin. The user can also choose to replace SteamOS with a different operating system entirely, as it supports multi-booting. The device's built-in browser supports Xbox Cloud Gaming, allowing those with Xbox Game Pass subscriptions access to that library of games. Microsoft released a version of Microsoft Edge for Linux which improved support for Xbox Cloud Gaming as well as Google Stadia. Newell stated that Valve would support Microsoft in bringing Xbox Game Pass to Steam and Steam Deck if they want that route.

As part of the Steam Deck's launch, Valve released Aperture Desk Job, a spinoff game in the Portal series, for free on March 1, 2022, available to all Windows and Linux/SteamOS users. The game is designed to demonstrate the various features of the Steam Deck, though is still playable with a controller for other systems.

To assist in developing and testing software for the Steam Deck, Valve released SteamOS Devkit Client and Server under open-source licenses.

Drivers for Windows are provided by Valve and AMD, but Valve does not provide support for them.

Reception
The initial reaction to the announcement of the Steam Deck was positive. Epic Games' Tim Sweeney and Xbox Game Studios' Phil Spencer complimented Valve on the Steam Deck, with Sweeney calling it an "amazing move by Valve!" Spencer congratulated Valve "on getting so many of us excited to be able to take our games with us wherever we decide to play".

Many outlets compared the unit to that of the Nintendo Switch, generally recognized as the first true hybrid video game console. Valve stated that they did not really consider the Switch in designing the Deck, as they "tried to make all the decisions really in Steam Deck that targeted that audience and that served the customers that were already having a good time interacting with the games that are on that platform, on our platform", and that by happenstance, came out with a device that was similar in function to the Switch. The Verge stated that generally, the Steam Deck was a more powerful machine compared to the Switch, but that power came with a tradeoff in battery life which was greater with the Switch. Further, The Verge recognized that the specifications of the Deck were more comparable to the power of the consoles of the eighth generation like the Xbox One and PlayStation 4, though using more recent compute/micro- and graphics architectures than that which powered those older systems. Kotaku stated that while the Deck and Switch may be similar in concept, the two were not competing devices due to their target demographics, with the Switch aimed more at a broad audience machine, while the Deck was geared towards more "hardcore" gamers. Digital Foundry noted that while the Deck's hardware may be more powerful, non-Linux developers are not necessarily able to get low-level access to the CPU/GPU as developers working on the Switch due to the Proton emulation layer.

One of the main criticisms of the Steam Deck highlighted by multiple reviewers has been its battery life. Matt Hanson writing for TechRadar stated, "Less welcome is the fact that the battery life of the Steam Deck is pretty poor, with it just about managing one and a half hours while playing God of War" and that "Unfortunately during our time with the Steam Deck, battery life is an issue." He expanded by saying "That’s going to upset a lot of people who may have been planning on using the Steam Deck for long flights, for example" and that "it certainly makes this portable gaming system feel less… well, portable." Matt Miller writing for Game Informer said that "Battery life is a significant problem" and that the device's battery life was "Punishingly low". Steve Hogarty writing for The Independent said "The battery life is by far the Steam deck’s biggest weakness. The handheld PC chugs through juice like it’s going out of fashion, with some graphically demanding games draining a full charge in as little as two hours of playtime." Seth G. Macy writing for IGN wrote in very similar terms, saying, "Beyond that limitation, the biggest, most deflating issue I’ve had has been battery life. It’s all over the place and probably the biggest reality check when it comes to realizing the dream of truly untethered PC gaming." In terms of resolving this problem, Richard Leadbetter writing for Eurogamer said they "can't help feel that elements like fan noise and battery life can only be resolved with a revised processor on a more efficient process node."

Developer community
Following the February 2022 launch, the Steam Deck has fostered notable support from the third-party developer community with various third-party tools and applications compiled or ported for use on the Steam Deck or adapted for use on the Deck, including software and performance management, emulation and media management. 

Notable tools built or ported for use on the Deck include:
 Lutris - an open-source game manager which allows the usage of the Wine compatibility layer to run Windows-based applications.
 Decky - a tool for allowing the installation and management of plugins within SteamOS.
 EmuDeck - a package manager which enables easy-access installation and management of Linux and Proton-compatible emulators (including, but not limited to RetroArch, PCSX2, Dolphin, RPCS3, Cemu & Yuzu) and the organisation of game images within SteamOS' Gaming Mode UI.

See also 

 Ayaneo, a competing brand of handheld gaming PCs
 GPD Win, an earlier similar device

References

External links

 

2022 in video gaming
Computer-related introductions in 2022
Golden Joystick Award winners
Handheld personal computers
Gaming computers
Products introduced in 2022
Steam (service)
X86-based computers